Hail Mary is the fourth and final studio album by American metalcore band Iwrestledabearonce. The album was released on June 16, 2015 through Artery Recordings, and was produced by guitarist Steven Bradley. It is the second and last album with vocalist Courtney Laplante.

Background
The song "Erase It All" was released on April 6, 2015. The song features guest vocals by Eddie Hermida of Suicide Silence. A music video for album opener "Gift of Death" was released on May 12 via YouTube and Alternative Press. The song received positive reviews upon its release. The album's second music video, "Green Eyes", was released on June 9.

Writing
Vocalist Courtney LaPlante stated she played a bigger role in the writing process for Hail Mary than she did for Late for Nothing. After feeling "a bit isolated" during the last album's writing process, LaPlante said she "was there for every single moment" on Hail Mary.

Track listing

Personnel 

Iwrestledabearonce
 Courtney LaPlante – vocals
 Steven Bradley – guitar, programming
 Mike Stringer – guitar, programming
 Mike "Rickshaw" Martin – bass
 Mikey Montgomery – drums

Additional personnel
 Eddie Hermida – additional vocals on track 4
 Steven Bradley – recording, mixing, production
 Daniel McBride – artwork, layout, photography

References

2015 albums
Iwrestledabearonce albums
Artery Recordings albums
Deathcore albums